Boada de Campos is a municipality located in the province of Palencia, Castile and León, Spain. It is in the Tierra de Campos.

According to the 2004 census (INE), the municipality had a population of 22 inhabitants.

Ecology

The municipality is included in a Special Protection Area. A site of particular interest to bird-watchers is the Laguna de Boada, a restored wetland. It is noted for its wintering waterfowl.

References

Municipalities in the Province of Palencia
Birdwatching sites in Spain